Thomas Black (1 December 1908 – after 1940) was a Scottish footballer who played as a left half in the Football League for Plymouth Argyle and Southend United. He also appeared for Arsenal in the FA Cup.

Life and career
Black was born in Holytown. He began his career as an amateur with Strathclyde before joining Football League club Arsenal in 1931. Having spent two seasons playing for the club's reserves, Black was called up to the first team by Herbert Chapman for an FA Cup third round match at Walsall in January 1933. The home side won 2–0, with the second goal coming from a penalty that was given for a foul by Black. He was transfer-listed by Chapman and sold to Second Division club Plymouth Argyle within a week of the defeat. Black made nine appearances in his first two seasons with the club before establishing himself as their first-choice left half during the 1934–35 campaign.

Argyle finished fifth in the league in the 1936–37 season, and Black played in 41 games, which was a career best. After seven seasons with the club and 168 appearances in all competitions, Black moved to Third Division South team Southend United. He played in the first three league games of the 1939–40 campaign before it was abandoned due to the Second World War.

References

1908 births
Year of death unknown
Footballers from North Lanarkshire
Scottish footballers
Arsenal F.C. players
Plymouth Argyle F.C. players
Southend United F.C. players
English Football League players
Strathclyde F.C. players
Association football wing halves
Scottish Junior Football Association players